Lisvany Arlys Pérez Rodríguez (born 24 January 1982) is a Cuban-born athlete competing in the high jump and triple jump. He now represents Spain.

His personal best jump in high jump is 2.29 metres, achieved in March 2005 in Havana. His personal best in triple jump is 16.82 metres, achieved in August 2011 in Málaga.

Competition record

References

sports-reference

1982 births
Living people
Cuban male high jumpers
Spanish male triple jumpers
Athletes (track and field) at the 2003 Pan American Games
Pan American Games competitors for Cuba
Athletes (track and field) at the 2004 Summer Olympics
Olympic athletes of Cuba
Cuban emigrants to Spain